Grantley may refer to -
Places
Grantley, North Yorkshire, England
Grantley Hall, a country estate in North Yorkshire, England
Grantley, Pennsylvania, United States
Grantley Harbor, a waterway in Port Clarence, Alaska, United States
People
Baron Grantley, a title in the Peerage of Great Britain
Fletcher Norton, 1st Baron Grantley (1716-1789)
William Norton, 2nd Baron Grantley (1742-1822)
John Norton, 5th Baron Grantley (1865-1943)
Richard Norton, 8th Baron Grantley (b. 1956)
Gyton Grantley (b. 1980), Australian actor
Steve Grantley (fl. 1980s), British rock drummer 
Other
Grantley Adams International Airport, Barbados